Lamium amplexicaule, commonly known as common henbit, or greater henbit, is a species of Lamium native to Europe, Asia and northern Africa.

The leaves are opposite, rounded,  diameter, with a lobed margin. The specific name refers to the amplexicaul leaves (leaves grasping the stem).

Description
Henbit is an annual herb with a sprawling habit and short, erect, squarish, lightly hairy stems. The leaves are in opposite pairs, often with long internodes. The lower leaves are stalked and the upper ones stalkless, often fused, and clasping the stems. The blades are hairy and kidney-shaped, with rounded teeth. The flowers are relatively large and form a few-flowered terminal spike with axillary whorls. The calyx is regular with five lobes and closes up after flowering. There are four stamens, two long and two short. The gynoecium has two fused carpels and the fruit is a four-chambered schizocarp.

This plant flowers very early in the spring even in northern areas, and for most of the winter and the early spring in warmer locations such as the Mediterranean region. At times of year when there are not many pollinating insects, the flowers self-pollinate.

Distribution and habitat

 Henbit dead-nettle is probably native to the Mediterranean region but has since spread around the world. It is found growing in open areas, gardens, fields and meadows. 
It propagates freely by seed, where it becomes a key part of a meadow ecosystem, Sometimes entire fields will be reddish-purple with its flowers before spring ploughing. Where common, it is an important nectar and pollen plant for bees, especially honeybees, where it helps start the spring build up.

It is widely naturalised in eastern North America and elsewhere. However, its attractive appearance, edibility, and readiness to grow in many climates often mean it is permitted to grow when other weeds are not. This plant, though common, is not regarded as a threat to local ecosystems. It plays an arguably beneficial role in its environment by providing nectar to pollinators and providing forage for animals. The seed is also eaten by many species of birds.

Uses

The young leaves and shoots can be eaten raw or cooked, as can the stems and flowers. Henbit has a slightly sweet and peppery flavor, similar to celery.

References

External links

 Jepson Manual Treatment
 USDA Plants Profile
 

amplexicaule
Edible plants
Flora of North Africa
Flora of Asia
Flora of Europe
Plants described in 1753
Taxa named by Carl Linnaeus